{{DISPLAYTITLE:C7H6O5}}
The molecular formula C7H6O5 (molar mass: 170.12 g/mol, exact mass: 170.021523 u) may refer to:

 Gallic acid, a phenolic compound
 Phloroglucinol carboxylic acid, a phenolic compound

Molecular formulas